The Du Chef River is a tributary of the Ashuapmushuan River, flowing into the Saguenay-Lac-Saint-Jean, in Quebec, in Canada. The course of the river crosses the Regional County Municipality (RCM) of:
Maria-Chapdelaine: unorganized territory of Rivière-Mistassini, Quebec;
Le Domaine-du-Roy: unorganized territory of Lac-Ashuapmushuan, Quebec.

The "Du Chef River" is the main tributary of the Ashuapmushuan River. It runs in the cantons of Bonne, Gauvin, Duberger, Thibaudeau, Saracen, Denys, Piat, Corbeil, Guyart, Aiguillon, Théberge and Desgly. The lower part of the river course is the separation between the RCM Le Domaine-du-Roy and the MRC Maria-Chapdelaine. While the intermediate and upper part of the river passes in the RCM of Le Domaine-du-Roy along more or less the limit of the two MRC. Forestry is the main economic activity of this valley; recreational tourism activities, second.

Forest Road R0203 (North-South direction) serves the valley of Hilarion River, "Du Chef River" and Nestaocano River; this
road starting south at the junction of route 167 which links Chibougamau to Saint-Félicien, Quebec.

The surface of "Du Chef River" is usually frozen from early November to mid-May, however, safe ice circulation is generally from mid-November to mid-April.

Geography

Toponymy 
The origin of this hydronym remains unknown. This name, which is in use at least in the nineteenth century, is indicated in
particular on a map of the surveyor Henry O'Sullivan, drawn as a result of explorations carried out between 1897 and 1899. From the end of the seventeenth century, this Stream was used as one of the ordinary routes of travel between lakes Saint-Jean and Mistassini. Botanist André Michaux borrowed it in 1792.

This watercourse is designated "Shetshishkuesheu" by the Innu commconverty, meaning "river where there is shade".

The toponym "Rivière du Chef" was officialized on December 5, 1968, at the Commission de toponymie du Québec, when it was created.

Notes and references

See also 

Rivers of Saguenay–Lac-Saint-Jean
Le Domaine-du-Roy Regional County Municipality
Maria-Chapdelaine Regional County Municipality